The TJ and CA series are a family of naturally-aspirated V10 and V8 Formula One racing engines, in both 2.4-litre and 3-litre engine configurations, designed and developed by Cosworth; and produced between  and . The customer engines were used by Minardi, Red Bull, Toro Rosso, Williams, Lotus, HRT, Virgin, and Marussia.

Background
Jaguar pulled out of F1 at the end of 2004, but the team (renamed Red Bull Racing) continued to use Cosworth V10 engines until switching to a Ferrari V8 for 2006. Minardi also used re-badged Cosworth engines until 2005.

Williams began testing the new CA2006 2.4-litre V8 in November 2005, which produced about 755 bhp @ 19,250 rpm (315 hp/L), and began using Cosworth V8 engines for the 2006 season. In the same year, Scuderia Toro Rosso used detuned V10 engines based on the 2005 units.

For 2006, engines had to be a 90° V8 configuration of 2.4 litres maximum capacity with a circular bore of  maximum, which implies a  stroke at maximum bore. The engines must have two inlet and two exhaust valves per cylinder, be naturally aspirated and have a  minimum weight. The previous year's engines with a rev-limiter were permitted for 2006 and 2007 for teams who were unable to acquire a V8 engine, with Scuderia Toro Rosso using a rev-limited and air-restricted version of the Cosworth TJ2005 V10; after Red Bull's takeover of the former Minardi team did not include the new engines. The 2006 season saw the highest rev limits in the history of Formula One, at well over 20,000 rpm; before a 19,000 rpm mandatory rev limiter was implemented for all competitors in 2007. Cosworth was able to achieve just over 20,000 rpm with their V8.

In 2007, however, the company was left without a partner when Williams chose to switch to Toyota power, and Scuderia Toro Rosso made the switch to Ferrari engines  (as used in 2006 by their mother team Red Bull Racing).

In Max Mosley's letter following the withdrawal of Honda from Formula One in December 2008, it was announced that Cosworth had won the tender to provide a standard engine to any interested participants. The new engine would become the standard design and manufacturers could opt to use whole units, construct their own from designs provided by Cosworth, or produce their own engine with the caveat that it be limited to the same power as the new "standard" engine.

In 2010 Cosworth returned as the engine supplier for Williams and three new teams; Hispania Racing, Lotus Racing and Virgin Racing. The CA2010 is the same 2.4-litre V8 base of the CA2006 used by Williams, but has been re-tuned for the then-mandated 18,000 rpm limit required on all engines, down from its original 20,000 rpm implementation. First units were ready and shipped to teams in mid-January for fitting 2 weeks prior to first track testing for the year.

Complete Formula One results
(key)

References

Cosworth
V8 engines
V10 engines
Formula One engines